Montxu Miranda Díez (born 27 December 1976 in Santurce) is a Spanish pole vaulter. His personal best of 5.81 metres, achieved in September 2000 in Barcelona, is still the standing Spanish national record .

Achievements

External links

1976 births
Living people
Spanish male pole vaulters
Sportspeople from Biscay
Athletes (track and field) at the 2000 Summer Olympics
Olympic athletes of Spain
Athletes (track and field) at the 1997 Mediterranean Games
Mediterranean Games competitors for Spain
People from Santurtzi
Athletes from the Basque Country (autonomous community)